The Potez 75 was a low-cost, simple, ground-support, observation and launch aircraft for anti-tank missiles, designed and built in the early 1950s, for use in colonial conflicts. One hundred and fifteen were ordered in 1956, but cancelled in 1957.

Design and development

The Potez 75 was developed by the reformed Potez Company which had originally been founded by Henry Potez in 1919. The type was designed to meet the requirement for a launching platform for Nord SS.10 wire-guided anti-tank missiles. It was of all-metal construction, with a pusher engine. The twin fins and tailplane were carried on two booms extending from the lower rear fuselage and it was fitted with a fixed tricycle undercarriage. The missile operator sat in the nose, behind which was a small upper cabin accommodating the pilot. Initially the operator's cabin had windows and the pilot's position was open, but later modifications enclosed the latter and provided the operator with better visibility by full glazing.

Operational history

The aircraft first flew on 10 June 1953 with experimental registration F-ZWSA, but later as F-WGVK and finally as the military F-MAFY. It had four 7.5 mm guns in the lower nose and could carry eight under-wing rockets. It was tested by the French military and found unsatisfactory as a missile platform. It was modified to light ground attack configuration and tested in the Algerian War, excelling in this role and orders were placed for 15 pre-production and 100 production machines in 1956. This order was cancelled the following year as part of defence budget cuts. Exhibited at the May 1957 Paris Air Show, the prototype was subsequently used as a liaison aircraft and scrapped after crash landing on 16 September 1958.

Specifications

References

Further reading

1950s French attack aircraft
075
Twin-boom aircraft
Low-wing aircraft
Single-engined pusher aircraft
Aircraft first flown in 1953